Bernard Bissonnette (January 15, 1898 – November 11, 1964) was a lawyer, merchant, educator, judge and political figure in Quebec. He represented L'Assomption in the Legislative Assembly of Quebec from 1939 to 1944 as a Liberal. Bissonnette was Speaker of the Legislative Assembly from 1940 to 1942.

Early life 
He was born in Saint-Esprit, Quebec, the son of Pierre-Julien-Léonidas Bissonnette and Juliette Lamarche. Bissonnette was educated at the Collège de l'Assomption and the Université de Montréal.

Career 
He articled in law with Amédée Monet, was called to the Quebec bar in 1920 and set up practice in Montréal. He later practised in partnership with Honoré Mercier and with Roch Pinard. In 1931, he was named King's Counsel. He was a co-founder of the L'Assomption Shoe company. He resigned his seat in 1942 after he was named to the Court of King's Bench.

He taught constitutional law and civil law in the law faculty of the Université de Montréal. Bissonnette was secretary of the Barreau de Montréal in 1927. In 1935, he married Jacqueline Masson.

Bissonnette died in Montreal at the age of 66 and was buried in the Notre Dame des Neiges Cemetery.

References 

 

Presidents of the National Assembly of Quebec
People from Lanaudière
Quebec Liberal Party MNAs
Judges in Quebec
1898 births
1985 deaths
Burials at Notre Dame des Neiges Cemetery